The 1969 European Judo Championships were the 18th edition of the European Judo Championships, and were held in Ostend, Belgium in May 1969. Championships were subdivided into six individual competitions, and a separate team competition.

Medal overview

Individual

Teams

Medal table

Notes

References 
 Results of the 1969 European Judo Championships (JudoInside.com)

E
European Judo Championships
Judo
Sport in Ostend
Judo competitions in Belgium
International sports competitions hosted by Belgium
European Judo Championships